The men's football tournament at the 2015 Pan American Games in Toronto, Canada was held at the Hamilton Pan Am Soccer Stadium in Hamilton from July 12 to 26.

For the football competition in these Games, the men competed in an eight-team tournament. The teams were grouped into two pools of four teams each for a round-robin preliminary round. The top two teams in each group advanced to a single elimination bracket. The men's competition was an under-22 event, with each team supplemented with up to three over age players.

Mexico were the defending champions from the 2011 Pan American Games in Guadalajara. The gold medal was won by Uruguay.

Qualification
A total of eight men's teams qualified to compete at the games. Hosts Canada and Mexico qualified automatically. The winners of the regional Caribbean and Central American championships also qualified. Teams placing between 3rd and 6th at the South American Championship also qualified.

Summary

Qualified teams
The following eight teams qualified for the final tournament.

Medalists

Rosters

At the start of tournament, all eight participating countries had to submit up to 18 players on their rosters.

Competition format

In the first round of the competition, teams were divided into two groups of four teams, played in round-robin format with each of the teams playing all other teams in the group once. Teams were awarded three points for a win, one point for a draw and zero points for a loss. The teams were ranked as follows:
Points
Goal difference
Goals scored
Head-to-head points
Drawing of lots

Following the completion of the group games, the top two teams in each group advanced to the semifinals, with the winners of one group playing the runners-up of another group. The winners of the semifinals advanced to the gold medal match and the losers advanced to the bronze medal match.

All games were played in two 45-minute halves. In the medal round, if the match ended in a draw after 90 minutes, extra time was played (two 15-minute halves), followed by penalty kicks competition if the match still remained tied.

First round
The official detailed schedule and draw was revealed on April 24, 2015.

All times were Eastern Daylight Time (UTC−4)

Group A

Group B

Medal round

Semifinals

Bronze medal match

Gold medal match

Competition summary

Goalscorers

5 goals
 Luciano

4 goals
 Clayton

3 goals
 Jorman Aguilar

2 goals

 Rômulo
 Martín Zúñiga
 Fidel Escobar
 Josiel Núñez
 Sebastián Ferreira
 Brian Lozano

1 goal

 Dodô
 Erik
 Luan
 Lucas Piazon
 Molham Babouli
 Daniel Álvarez
 Marco Bueno
 Carlos Cisneros
 Jonathan Espericueta
 Jordan Silva
 Ángel Zaldívar
 Derlis Alegre
 Arturo Aranda
 Ángel Cardozo
 Iván Ramírez
 Gonzalo Maldonado
 Elsar Rodas
 Nathaniel Garcia
 Shackeil Henry
 Ricardo John
 Nicolás Albarracín
 Fabricio Formiliano
 Fernando Gorriarán
 Federico Ricca
 Michael Santos
 Andrés Schettino

1 own goal
 Manjrekar James (playing against Peru)

Final standings

References

External links
Football - Event Overview - Men, Toronto 2015 Official Website

Men
2015 in Brazilian football
2015 in Canadian soccer
2015 in Peruvian football
2015 in Paraguayan football
2015–16 in Uruguayan football
2015–16 in Mexican football
2015–16 in Trinidad and Tobago football
2015–16 in Panamanian football